Barnowiec  is a village in the administrative district of Gmina Kołczygłowy, within Bytów County, Pomeranian Voivodeship, in northern Poland.

The surrounding terrain is very mountainous, with 3 large mountains in a 4 km radious of the village. Wierch nad Kamieniem is just 2.3 km from the village, Pisana Hala at 3.3 km from the village and finally Pstra at 3.7 km from the village centre.

Before 1637 Duchy of Pomerania, next area of Farther Pomerania, was part of Germany. For the history of the region, see History of Pomerania.

The village has a population of 240.

Notable residents
Johanna von Bismarck, née von Puttkamer (1824-1894) wife of Otto von Bismarck

References

Barnowiec